Hussein M'Barki (born 29 December 1955) is a Moroccan former rugby union and rugby league footballer who played in the 1970s, 1980s and 1990s.

M'Barki started his career in rugby union, and began representing Morocco in 1975 at the age of 19. He later moved to France, where he played for Narbonne and Cahors.

In September 1981, he appeared twice as a trialist for rugby league club Fulham. He completed his move to Fulham in November 1981 after securing a work permit.

M'Barki left the club in 1984, and went on to play for Warrington, Oldham (Heritage No. 902) and Hull F.C. before returning to Fulham in 1988, remaining with the club until his retirement in 1992. During his two spells with Fulham, he made a combined total of 163 appearances, scoring 74 tries. After ending his playing career, he worked as a development officer, helping to promote rugby league in his home country.

In 2014, M'Barki was inducted into London Broncos' Hall of Fame.

County Cup final appearances
Hussein M'Barki played  in Oldham's 6–27 defeat by Wigan in the 1986 Lancashire County Cup Final during the 1986–87 season at Knowsley Road, St. Helens on Sunday 19 October 1986.

References

External links
Career statistics at orl-heritagetrust.org.uk
Career statistics at wolvesplayers.thisiswarrington.co.uk

1955 births
Living people
Hull F.C. players
London Broncos players
Moroccan rugby league players
Moroccan rugby union players
Morocco international rugby union players
Oldham R.L.F.C. players
RC Narbonne players
Rugby league centres
Rugby league fullbacks
Rugby league wingers
Rugby union fullbacks
Warrington Wolves players